Hartley Outdoor Education Center is a member of the Saginaw Intermediate School District located  northwest of St. Charles, Michigan in Saginaw County. Since its opening in 1975, Hartley's  have entertained and educated approximately 250,000 students and houses about 4,000 students each year. It is designed to educate elementary and middle school students, but is not limited to this and can teach high school students as well. As both a camp and a school, many students learn topics they normally wouldn't learn inside a classroom, by going through cabins, coal mines, forests, wetlands, meadows and ponds to learn about topics such as survival, pioneer living, or confidence, enjoying themselves in the process.

History
The Hartley Nature Camp Corporation was created in 1948 by Peter Hartley. The camp continued until acquired by the SISD in 1969. In 1975, Hartley Outdoor Education Center opened its door. It was founded on the site of Coal Mine No. 8 and is also home to the Schroeder Log Cabin.

Classes
Students are the given opportunities to participate in their classes by making things such as apple cider, candles, funnel cake, and necklaces or learn by seeing wigwams, longhouses, coal mines, reptiles, other animals, or other entities.

The classes include:
 Archeology Dig
 Beaver Creek Watershed Study
 Bird Study
 Mine No. 8
 Confidence Course
 Discovering Fossils
 Ecology in Action
 Forest Investigation
 Fossils and Coal Mine
 Lumberjack Lore
 Michigan Mammals
 Native American Heritage
 Outdoor Photography
 Outdoor Survival
 Pioneer Living
 Wetland Lab

Staff from the center can also bring special classes to schools upon request.

Recreation
For the students, Hartley is most notable for its recreational output. It has five tobogganing hills, an outdoor athletic facility consisting of a hockey rink, tetherball and basketball court, baseball, football, and soccer fields, and much more, various indoor games for rainy weather or during free time (with many created just for Hartley), and most notably "Almost Anything Goes" Night. "Almost Anything Goes" Night, is a competition where students participate in many different and unique obstacles, and the score has no purpose. Just like the rest of Hartley, all students, regardless of disabilities, can participate.

Housing
At each end of the building is a dorm, one for girls and one for boys. Each dorm consists of approximately twenty bunks for the students, two adjacent sleeping quarters for advisers and counselors, and a bathroom (complete with toilets, sinks, and showers). The students are responsible for keeping each of their areas neat and clean in an effort to instill positive values. Any pieces of trash on the floor are given the Hartley nickname of “trash”.

The Center provides breakfast, lunch, and dinner, as well as snacks before bed. They are provided in such a way that if a student finishes their food, they are then allowed seconds and thirds until all prepared food is eaten. The students are also responsible for keeping the cafeteria clean.

References

External links
 Hartley Outdoor Education Center

Saginaw Intermediate School District
Buildings and structures in Saginaw County, Michigan
Nature centers in Michigan
Education in Saginaw County, Michigan